Viacheslav Dmitrievich Andrusenko (born 14 May 1992) is a Russian swimmer. He competed in the men's 4 × 200 metre freestyle relay event at the 2016 Summer Olympics.

References

External links
 

1992 births
Living people
Russian male swimmers
Russian male freestyle swimmers
Olympic swimmers of Russia
Swimmers at the 2016 Summer Olympics
Universiade medalists in swimming
European Aquatics Championships medalists in swimming
Universiade bronze medalists for Russia
Medalists at the 2017 Summer Universiade
20th-century Russian people
21st-century Russian people